The XR class are a class of diesel locomotives built by Freight Australia at their South Dynon workshops.

History
The first members of the XR class were rebuilt in from first and second series X class locomotives between 2002 and 2004, with more powerful rebuilt engines cascaded from the G class, larger radiators, and a new cab to provide better driver visibility. They were not reclassed and renumbered as the XR class until 2004. The second group of three locomotives were built from scratch, entering service from late 2005. They differ from the earlier units as 'elephant ears' noise deflectors are fitted to the radiators. X36 was supposed to be rebuilt into XR556, but by then it was realized that building new locomotives from scratch was more cost effective, so it continued life un-rebuilt, until being scrapped in 2015.

The class are mechanically similar to the later XRB class B units. Units currently in service are operated by Pacific National.

Status table

See also
Victorian Railways X class (diesel)
Victorian XRB class (diesel)

References

Co-Co locomotives
Pacific National diesel locomotives
Railway locomotives introduced in 2004
XR class
Standard gauge locomotives of Australia
Broad gauge locomotives in Australia
Diesel-electric locomotives of Australia